Varekilsnäs is a community located on the island of Orust in Bohuslän, on the Swedish west coast. It is the first village you meet when you enter Orust on road 160 from Tjörn. 

Varekilsnäs has records from 14th century, but is today more known for its scenic location and beautiful views over the archipelago.

External links
Pictures from Varekilsnäs - Pictures

Populated places in Västra Götaland County